Terikeste is a village in Kastre Parish, Tartu County in Estonia.

References

Villages in Tartu County